Arthur's Desperate Resolve is a 1916 American silent short comedy directed by and starring William Garwood and Edward Brady. Lois Wilson and Alfred Allen
also starred.

External links

1916 comedy films
1916 films
Silent American comedy films
American silent short films
American black-and-white films
1916 short films
American comedy short films
1910s American films
1910s English-language films
English-language comedy films